The Battle of Las Carreras was a major battle during the years after the Dominican War of Independence and was fought on the 21–22 April 1849, nearby Baní, Peravia Province. A force of 800 Dominican troops, a portion of the Army of the South, led by General Pedro Santana, defeated an outnumbering force of 10,000 troops of the Haitian Army led by Faustin Soulouque.

Battle
The battle opened with a cannon barrage and devolved into hand-to-hand combat. As the remnants of the Haitian army retreated along the southern coastal road, they were under fire from a small Dominican squadron. Haitian strategy was ridiculed by the American press:

References

Bibliography
 
 
 

Las Carreras
Las Carreras
Las Carreras
1849 in the Dominican Republic
April 1849 events